Kalehjoosh or Kaljoosh (Persian: کلجوش) is a popular traditional soup in Iran, Armenia, Azerbaijan, and Turkey (or ).

Etymology

Regional recipes 
Within Iran, kalehjoosh has different regional recipes and cooking styles in Isfahan, Yazd, and Khorasan. Iranian kalehjoosh recipes may include meat (optional), kashk, yogurt, dried fenugreek, dried mint, roasted onions, walnuts.

In Turkey, the recipe may include chickpeas, lentils, white beet and meat, all of which are cooked separately. Onion is added to the meat, and then they add everything to broth and set it to simmer. The kashk is added in last. The Turkish variety includes topping the soup with butter and red pepper sauce.

See also
 List of soups
 Iranian cuisine

References

Iranian soups
Turkish soups
Azerbaijani soups